Énora Villard (born 27 October 1993 in Aix-en-Provence) is a French professional squash player. As of February 2018, she was ranked number 66 in the world.

Career
In 2018, she was part of the French team that won the bronze medal at the 2018 Women's World Team Squash Championships.

References

1993 births
Living people
French female squash players